Max Stotz (13 February 1912 – 19 August 1943) was an Austrian Luftwaffe military aviator during World War II, a fighter ace credited with shooting down 189 enemy aircraft claimed in more than 700 combat missions.

Born in Mannswörth, Stotz volunteered for military service in the Austrian Army in 1933. In 1935, he transferred to the Austrian Air Force and following the Anschluss, Austria's annexation into Nazi Germany, he served in the German Luftwaffe, initially with Jagdgeschwader 76 (JG 76—76th Fighter Wing) and later with Jagdgeschwader 54 (JG 54—54th Fighter Wing). He flew his first combat missions in the Invasion of Poland and claimed his first aerial victory during the "Phoney War" period on the Western Front. Following his 53rd aerial victory he was awarded the Knight's Cross of the Iron Cross, the highest award in the military and paramilitary forces of Nazi Germany during World War II, on 19 June 1942 and the Knight's Cross of the Iron Cross with Oak Leaves on 30 October 1942 after 100 victories.

In early August 1943, Stotz was appointed Staffelkapitän (squadron leader) of the 5. Staffel (5th squadron) of JG 54. Stotz was posted as missing in action after aerial combat near Vitebsk on 19 August 1943. He was promoted to Hauptmann (captain) posthumously.

Early life and career
Stotz was born on 13 February 1912 in Mannswörth, at the time in Austria-Hungary. He was the son of a farmer and joined the military service in the Austrian Army (Bundesheer) on 7 April 1933. He initially served as a Gebirgsjäger with Alpenjäger-Regiment 11 in Klagenfurt. In 1935, he requested transfer to the Austrian Air Force (Österreichische Luftstreitkräfte) and was transferred to Flieger-Regiment 2 in Graz. There, from 1 July to 23 November 1936, he was trained as a pilot. From 24 November 1936 to 5 May 1938, Stotz served with Flieger-Regiment 1 at Wiener Neustadt. At Wiener Neustadt, he was a member of the aerobatics squadron in 1937/38. Following the Anschluss, Austria's annexation into Nazi Germany on 12 March 1938, Stotz was accepted into the German Luftwaffe and became a pilot with 1. Staffel (1st squadron) of Jagdgeschwader 76 (JG 76—76th Fighter Wing), a squadron of I. Gruppe (1st group) under the command of Oberleutnant Dietrich Hrabak.

World War II
World War II in Europe began on Friday 1 September 1939 when German forces invaded Poland. I. Gruppe of JG 76 participated in the invasion and returned to its home airfield at Wien-Aspern where it remained until end of October. On 26 October, the Gruppenstab and 1. Staffel were ordered to Frankfurt Rhein-Main where it was united again with 2. and 3. Staffel on 2 November. From Frankfurt Rhein-Main, the Gruppe flew fighter protection during the "Phoney War" for the Frankfurt, Rhine and Saar region. On 5 November, Stotz received the Iron Cross 2nd Class. The next day, he claimed his first aerial victory over a Royal Air Force (RAF) Bristol Blenheim bomber near Völklingen. In April 1940, I. Gruppe moved to an airfield at Mainz-Finthen, originally named Fliegerhorst Ober-Olm. The Gruppe stayed at Ober-Olm until the Battle of France began.

On 11 May, I. Gruppe moved from Ober-Olm to Wengerohr, present-day a suburb of Wittlich. From Wengerohr, the unit flew combat air patrols in the area of Montmédy, Charleville-Mézières and Bastogne. On 14 May, I. Gruppe flew combat missions over the Meuse and Sedan area during the Battle of Sedan. In this action, Stotz claimed two Fairey Battle light bombers shot down over the Sedan combat area. Following the German advance into France, I. Gruppe was moved to a airfields at Bastogne and Nives on 15 May. On 19 May, Stotz claimed a Potez 63 and a Morane-Saulnier M.S.406 west of Laon. This earned him the Iron Cross 1st Class, awarded to him on 1 June 1940. On 21 May, I. Gruppe moved to Charleville from where the unit flew missions in the Battle of Dunkirk. On 3 June, I. Gruppe participated in Operation Paula (Unternehmen Paula), an offensive operation to destroy the remaining units of the Armée de l'Air. That day, Stotz claimed the destruction of a Curtiss P-36 Hawk fighter west of Épernay. Three days later, he claimed two further Curtiss fighters northwest of Amiens. The Gruppe was moved to Conteville on 7 June, to Guise on 16 June, and then to Émerainville on 18 June. On 19 June, I. Gruppe was withdrawn from France and moved to Brussels on 22 June.

On 26 June 1940, I. Gruppe of JG 76 was moved to the airfield at Waalhaven in the Netherlands and subordinated to Jagdgeschwader 54 (JG 54—54th Fighter Wing). There, the Gruppe was tasked with providing aerial protection over the Dutch coastal area. On 5 July, I./JG 76 was officially integrated into JG 54 and was renamed to II./JG 54. Three days later, Stotz claimed his last aerial victory on the Western Front over a Blenheim bomber south of Rotterdam. He was awarded the Honor Goblet of the Luftwaffe on 20 September 1940.

On 29 March 1941, II./JG 54 was withdrawn from the English Channel and was ordered to Graz-Thalerhof. There the various squadrons were split up with 4. Staffel being subordinated to III. Gruppe of Jagdgeschwader 77 (JG 77—77th Fighter Wing) and ordered to Deta in Romania. On 6 April, 4. Staffel flew combat missions in the Invasion of Yugoslavia. The next day, the Staffel flew combat air patrols on the Hungarian-Yugoslavian border. On 9 April, II./JG 54 was united again at Kecskemét, Hungary and returned to Deta on 11 April. The Gruppe was withdrawn from this theater on 19 April and ordered to an airfield at Zemun near Belgrade.

Operation Barbarossa

Following the surrender of the Royal Yugoslav Army on 17 April 1941, JG 54 received orders on 3 May 1941 to turn over all Bf 109-Es so they could receive the new Bf 109-F variant. Transition training was completed at Airfield Stolp-Reitz in Pomerania. Following intensive training, the Geschwader was moved to airfields in Eastern Prussia. II. Gruppe under command of Hauptmann Hrabak was moved to Trakehnen on 20 June 1941. The Wehrmacht launched Operation Barbarossa, the invasion of the Soviet Union, on 22 June with II. Gruppe supporting Army Group North in its strategic goal towards Leningrad.

On 25 June, II. Gruppe was moved to an airfield at Kowno and was tasked with providing fighter escort for Panzer Group 4 advancing towards the Düna river. The next day, Stotz claimed his first aerial victory in this theater of operations over a Tupolev SB-2 bomber in the vicinity of Ostrov.

Eastern Front
On 7 August 1942, Stotz flew one of ten Bf 109s escorting a formation of Junkers Ju 88 bombers from Kampfgeschwader 3 (KG 3—3rd Bomber Wing) attacking the Soviet 6th and 8th Tank Corps at Sychyovka when they were intercepted by eight Yakovlev Yak-1 fighters from 32 IAP (32nd Fighter Aviation Regiment). In this encounter, Stotz claimed two Yak-1s shot down.  On 16 August 1942, Stotz for the first time encountered the unknown to him Lavochkin La-5 fighter aircraft from 49 IAP (49th Fighter Aviation Regiment). That day, he claimed two aerial victories which were misidentified and filed as a Lavochkin-Gorbunov-Gudkov LaGG-3 and a Curtiss P-40 Warhawk.

On 29 October 1942, Stotz was credited with his 100th aerial victory. He was the 29th Luftwaffe pilot to achieve the century mark. The next day, he was awarded the Knight's Cross of the Iron Cross with Oak Leaves for this achievement. He was the 137th member of the German armed forces to be so honored. The presentation was made by Adolf Hitler personally. On this account, he was also promoted to Leutnant (second lieutenant), backdated to 1 October 1942. On 30 December 1942, Stotz claimed 10 aerial victories, bringing his total to 129. 

Stotz was promoted to Oberleutnant (first lieutenant) on 1 February 1943. He was appointed Staffelkapitän (squadron leader) of 5. Staffel of JG 54 on 10 August 1943. He succeeded Leutnant Emil Lang who had temporarily led the Staffel after Oberleutnant Alfred Teumer had been transferred in July. He was last seen drifting down over Soviet held territory. Command of 5. Staffel was then again given to Leutnant Lang.

Summary of career

Aerial victory claims
According to US historian David T. Zabecki, Stotz was credited with 189 aerial victories. Mathews and Foreman, authors of Luftwaffe Aces — Biographies and Victory Claims, researched the German Federal Archives and found documentation for 182 aerial victory claims, plus one further unconfirmed claim. This number includes 174 on the Eastern Front and 8 on the Western Front.

Victory claims were logged to a map-reference (PQ = Planquadrat), for example "PQ 28123". These sectors were then subdivided into 36 smaller units to give a location area 3 × 4 km in size.

Awards
 Iron Cross (1939) 
 2nd Class (5 November 1939)
 1st Class (1 June 1940)
 Honour Goblet of the Luftwaffe (Ehrenpokal der Luftwaffe) (28 September 1940)
 German Cross in Gold on 1 December 1941 as Oberfeldwebel in the 4./Jagdgeschwader 54
 Knight's Cross of the Iron Cross with Oak Leaves
 Knight's Cross on 19 June 1942 as Oberfeldwebel and pilot in the 5./Jagdgeschwader 54
 137th Oak Leaves on 30 October 1942 as Oberfeldwebel and pilot in the 5./Jagdgeschwader 54

See also
List of people who disappeared

Notes

References

Citations

Bibliography

 
 
 
 
 
 
 
 
 
 
 
 
 
 
 
 
 
 
 
 
 

1912 births
1940s missing person cases
1943 deaths
Aerial disappearances of military personnel in action
Luftwaffe personnel killed in World War II
German World War II flying aces
Luftwaffe pilots
Missing in action of World War II
People from Schwechat
Recipients of the Gold German Cross
Recipients of the Knight's Cross of the Iron Cross with Oak Leaves